Ervilia is a genus of marine clams in the family Semelidae.

Species 

Ervilia bisculpta Gould, 1861
Ervilia castanea (Montagu, 1803)
Ervilia concentrica (Holmes, 1860)
Ervilia nitens (Montagu, 1808)
Ervilia producta Odhner, 1922
Ervilia purpurea (Smith, 1906)
Ervilia scaliola 

Semelidae
Bivalve genera